The Day the World Ended is a 2001 American science fiction/horror television film and is the fourth in the Creature Features series broadcast on Cinemax. It stars Nastassja Kinski, Randy Quaid, and Bobby Edner.

While not being a direct remake of the 1955 film with a similar title (Day the World Ended), it utilizes the original film by showing segments on a TV seen within the story and showing that the VHS video box cover as part of the child's interest in aliens. Some scenes were filmed in Wrightwood, California.

Plot

This film finds an alien, who is misunderstood, bent on hunting down and devouring people. A school psychologist, Dr Jennifer Stillman (Nastassja Kinski) investigates the death of a student's mother and finds that the boy (Bobby Edner) believes he is the son of the being. His earthling father (Randy Quaid) is also a doctor, who has the boy in his care and holds that it is all in the boy's imagination.

Cast
 Nastassja Kinski as Dr. Jennifer Stillman
 Randy Quaid as Dr. Michael McCann
 Bobby Edner as Ben Miller/McCann
 Harry Groener as Sheriff Ken
 Lee de Broux as Cook Harlan (as Lee DeBroux)
 Stephen Tobolowsky as Principal Ed Turner
 Debra Christofferson as Nurse Della Divelbuss
 Nik Dressbach as Buzzcut
 Brandon de Paul as Frankie Carter
 Kate Fuglei as Waitress Carlita
 Neil Vipond as The Judge
 Brian Steele as The Creature
 David Getz as Deputy #1
 Kathryn Fiore as Maggie Miller
 David Doty as Nice Guy
 Samantha Sansonetti as Crosswalk Child #1

Production

Produced as a series of cable tv movies which remade many movies originally by American International Pictures, although this film has little in similarity to the original, Day the World Ended, other than its title, and some clips from the first film seen on a TV.

Release
The film was released on Cinemax on November 23, 2001.

Reception
One review said, "It may be far from what Nastassja Kinski is capable of, but DAY THE WORLD ENDED is a fine film in its own right. Genuinely creepy and a real find for people who can't decide between psychological terror and popcorn-munching exploitation.". Moria gave the movie 2 out of 5 stars, finding the movie the dullest of the Creature Feature Series.

References

External links
 

2001 films
2001 horror films
2000s disaster films
2000s science fiction horror films
2001 television films
American science fiction horror films
American horror television films
American disaster films
Disaster television films
Films scored by Charles Bernstein
2000s monster movies
American science fiction television films
2000s English-language films
2000s American films